Jayme Richardson (née Paris, born 27 April 1989) is an Australian Paralympic cyclist. She was born in the Sydney suburb of Blacktown with cerebellar ataxia due to asphyxiation at birth. She began cycling in October 2004 after seeing a post Athens Paralympic interview with Silver Medalist Claire McLean where Claire said Australia needed more female Para-cyclists. At the time Jayme was a swimmer and was doing very well, having competed both through school to CHS Level and out of school to National Level, however she felt that there was something greater out there for her and decided that a change was needed.

She won a bronze medal at the 2008 Beijing Games in the Women's 500 m Time Trial LC3-4/CP3 event. At the 2012 London Paralympics, she won a bronze medal in the 500 m Time Trial C1–3, and also participated in the Women's Road Race C1–3, Women's Time Trial C1–3, Women's Individual Pursuit C1–3 and Women's 500 m Time Trial C1–3.

At the 2014 UCI Para-cycling Track World Championships in Aguascalientes, Mexico, she won gold medals in the Women's 3 km Individual Pursuit C1 and Women's 500 m Time Trial C1. Competing at the 2014 UCI Para-cycling Road World Championships in Greenville, South Carolina, Richardson won the Women’s Time Trial C1.

Recognition
In 2014, Richardson was named the Australian Paralympic Committee Elite Para-cycling Female Athlete of the Year.

References

External links

 
 

Paralympic cyclists of Australia
Cyclists at the 2008 Summer Paralympics
Cyclists at the 2012 Summer Paralympics
Medalists at the 2008 Summer Paralympics
Medalists at the 2012 Summer Paralympics
Paralympic bronze medalists for Australia
UCI Para-cycling World Champions
Cyclists from Sydney
Sportswomen from New South Wales
1989 births
Living people
Australian female cyclists
Paralympic medalists in cycling